Jay Adler (August 4, 1896 – September 24, 1978) was an American actor in theater, television, and film.

Early life
Born in New York City, he was the eldest son of actors Jacob and Sara Adler, and the brother of five actor siblings, including stage actor Luther and drama coach Stella. The Adlers were a Jewish-American acting dynasty in New York City's  Yiddish Theater District and they played a significant role in theater from the late 19th century to the 1950s. Stella Adler became the most influential member of their family.

Career
Adler's Broadway credits included Cafe Crown (1942), Blind Alley (1940, 1935), Prelude (1936), and Man Bites Dog (1933).

In 1934, Adler joined with Harry Thomashefsky and Boris Bernardi to form the Theater Mart Group, "a cooperative group of players and staff connected with the stage", in New York City. Plans called for production of plays like those done by the city's Group Theatre.

During a long acting career of minor character roles, Jay Adler appeared in more than 40 films and 37 television series between 1938 and 1976, accumulating more than 130 total performing credits. 

He appeared in The Big Combo (1955), Stanley Kubrick's The Killing (1956) and Jerry Lewis' The Family Jewels (1965).

In 1961, Adler appeared both in the episode "The Lady and the Lawyer" of the television series The Asphalt Jungle and in The Lawbreakers, a theatrical film version of the episode. In 1962, he appeared in the episode "To Climb Steep Hills" of the adventure drama television series Straightaway.

Politics
A lifelong Democrat, he and his siblings, supported Adlai Stevenson during the 1952 presidential election.

Death
Jay Adler died at age 81 in Woodland Hills, California and was buried in the Mount Carmel Cemetery in Glendale, Queens, New York City, New York near to his parents.

Partial filmographyNo Time to Marry (1938) - HessPenrod and His Twin Brother (1938) - JohnsonThe Saint in New York (1938) - Eddie, a Hood (uncredited)Murder in the Night (1939) - Drunk with Two Girls (uncredited)The Underworld Story (1950) - Munsey's Assistant (uncredited)Three Secrets (1950) - City Editor (uncredited)Cry Danger (1951) - WilliamsThe Mob (1951) - Russell - Hotel Clerk (uncredited)Scandal Sheet (1952) - Bailey (uncredited)My Six Convicts (1952) - Steve KopacDreamboat (1952) - Desk Clerk (uncredited)Assignment – Paris! (1952) - Henry (uncredited)My Man and I (1952) - Bartender (uncredited)The Prisoner of Zenda (1952) - Customs Officer (uncredited)The Turning Point (1952) - Sammy Lester (uncredited)My Pal Gus (1952) - Van Every (uncredited)The Bad and the Beautiful (1952) - Mr. Z - Party Guest (uncredited)The Juggler (1953) - Papa Sander - Susy's Father (uncredited)Vice Squad (1953) - Frankie Pierce99 River Street (1953) - ChristopherThe Long Wait (1954) - Joe—BellhopDown Three Dark Streets (1954) - Uncle Max - aka Charles MartellThe Big Combo (1955) - Detective Sam HillMurder Is My Beat (1955) - Bartender LouieLove Me or Leave Me (1955) - Orry (uncredited)Illegal (1955) - Joseph CarterLucy Gallant (1955) - Sam - Stationmaster (uncredited)Man with the Gun (1955) - Cal (uncredited)The Killing (1956) - Leo the LoansharkThe Catered Affair (1956) - Sam LeiterLust for Life (1956) - WaiterRunaway Daughters (1956) - Mr. RubeckCrime of Passion (1957) - NalenceSweet Smell of Success (1957) - Manny Davis (uncredited)Hell on Devil's Island (1957) - TotoThe Brothers Karamazov (1958) - PawnbrokerSaddle the Wind (1958) - Hank - Saloon Cleanup Man (uncredited)Seven Guns to Mesa (1958) - Ben AveryCurse of the Undead (1959) - Bartender - JakeThe Last Angry Man (1959) - Abelman's Feuding Neighbor (uncredited)The Story on Page One (1959) - Lauber (uncredited)All the Fine Young Cannibals (1960) - Sammy Trist (uncredited)Who's Got the Action? (1962) - Man in Car Accident (uncredited)Dime with a Halo (1963) - Mr. LewisWho's Been Sleeping in My Bed? (1963) - Patient (uncredited)Where Love Has Gone (1964) - Bartender (uncredited)The Family Jewels (1965) - Mr. Lyman, AttorneyThe Yin and the Yang of Mr. Go (1970) - Dr. YulBrother, Cry for Me (1970)Grave of the Vampire (1972) - Old ZackBummer (1973) - Sid RosenMacon County Line'' (1974) - Impound Yard Man

References

External links
 
 
 

1896 births
1978 deaths
Male actors from New York City
American male film actors
American male stage actors
American male television actors
American people of Russian-Jewish descent
Jewish American male actors
20th-century American male actors
20th-century American Jews